Tempyra biguttula is a species of dirt-colored seed bug in the family Rhyparochromidae. It is found in North America and Oceania.

References

External links

 

Rhyparochromidae
Articles created by Qbugbot
Insects described in 1874